The 1937 Saint Mary's Gaels football team was an American football team that represented Saint Mary's College of California during the 1937 college football season.  In their 17th season under head coach Slip Madigan, the Gaels compiled a 4–3–2 record and outscored their opponents by a combined total of 71 to 50.

Schedule

References

Saint Mary's
Saint Mary's Gaels football seasons
Saint Mary's Gaels football